Roitika or Royitika is a village in the municipal unit of Paralia, Achaea, Greece. It is situated on the Gulf of Patras, 2 km southwest of the village Paralia, and 8 km southwest from Patras city centre.  The population is around 1,300. The Greek National Road 9 (Patras - Pyrgos) runs east of the village.

See also

List of settlements in Achaea

References

Paralia, Achaea
Populated places in Achaea